Tom Rothrock (born May 29, 1978 Ellensburg, Washington) is an American former alpine skier who competed in the 2002 Winter Olympics.

References

1978 births
Living people
American male alpine skiers
Olympic alpine skiers of the United States
Alpine skiers at the 2002 Winter Olympics
People from Ellensburg, Washington